"Apparitions" is a song by Matthew Good Band. The third single released from the band's second studio album Underdogs, the song was very successful in Canada, nominated for "Best Single" at the 1999 Juno Awards. The edited version of the song is featured on the MuchMusic compilation album, Big Shiny Tunes 3. Good regards "Apparitions" as one of his best compositions.

Track listing

Music video
The music video for "Apparitions" reached #1 on MuchMusic Countdown for the week of October 30, 1998.

The video's director, Bill Morrison, won the award for Best Director at the 1998 Much Music Video Awards. The video was also nominated for "Best Video" at the 1999 Juno Awards.

Charts

References

1998 singles
Matthew Good Band songs
Songs written by Matthew Good
Songs written by Dave Genn
1997 songs
PolyGram singles
Mercury Records singles